The Collegiate Church of St Mary, Dumbarton, Scotland, was founded in about 1453 by Isabella, Countess of Lennox and Duchess of Albany. During the medieval period, collegiate churches took on the responsibility of caring for the sick and elderly within their parishes. St Mary's met these needs in a hospital attached to the main church building, and a separate leper house located at a "safe" distance from the town centre. The church ceased to exist at some time during the Scottish Reformation of the mid-sixteenth century.

The site of the collegiate church is now occupied by Dumbarton Central railway station.  All that remains of the once extensive building is one of the tower arches.  The stone arch was removed in 1850 to a site in Church Street, Dumbarton, and moved again in 1907 to its present location in the grounds of the town's registry office, beside the railway station.

See also
List of Collegiate churches in Scotland

References
Health Care in Medieval Dumbarton
The History of the Knights Templar in relation Scottish chronology
Ardchattan Parish : Barcaldine, Benderloch, N. Connel and Bonawe
 The Buildings of Scotland: Stirling and Central Scotland, by John Gifford and Frank Arneil Walker, 2002.

15th-century church buildings in Scotland
Christianity in medieval Scotland
Churches in West Dunbartonshire
Collegiate churches in Scotland
Dumbarton
Scottish medieval hospitals and almshouses
Former churches in Scotland